The Household No. 1 Site is an archaeological site in Westmoreland County, Pennsylvania, United States.  Located off Timms Lane in Rostraver Township, the site lies on a bluff above the Youghiogheny River.

Local archaeologists knew of the site in the early part of the twentieth century; the best records of the site are from amateur George Fisher, who studied the area from 1900 to 1950.  More complete records were obtained after a 1980 investigation, which was part of the planning for the construction of baseball fields in the vicinity.  Because archaeologists discovered a significant range of artifacts in the location, the fields were moved to allow for continued excavation.  This investigation determined that the site was that of a Monongahela village.

Evidence of warfare dominated the findings from the Household 1 Site.  Many burials were present at the site — including sixteen at the site of one house alone — and projectile points composed a much larger percentage of the total findings than did domestic tools.  Furthermore, the small total number of artifacts overall shows that the site was only occupied for a short period of time, and its location on a river bluff suggests that its site was chosen for defensibility.  These discoveries, like those at many other Monongahela village sites, demonstrate that the Household residents lived in a highly martial culture.

In 1986, the Household Site was added to the National Register of Historic Places for its archaeological significance.

See also
List of Native American archaeological sites on the National Register of Historic Places in Pennsylvania

References

Archaeological sites on the National Register of Historic Places in Pennsylvania
Former populated places in Pennsylvania
Monongahela culture
Native American populated places
Geography of Westmoreland County, Pennsylvania
National Register of Historic Places in Westmoreland County, Pennsylvania
Populated places on the National Register of Historic Places in Pennsylvania